Johannes Dietwald (born 13 April 1985 in Hanover) is a German former football player. He spent two seasons in the Bundesliga with Hannover 96.

References

1985 births
Living people
German footballers
Hannover 96 players
Hannover 96 II players
Bundesliga players
Association football midfielders
Footballers from Hanover